Charles Bernard Aptroot (born 20 September 1950) is a Dutch politician of the People's Party for Freedom and Democracy (VVD). He was a Member of the House of Representatives from 30 January 2003 to 19 September 2012. He focused on matters of traffic, public transport and internal affairs. On 1 September 2012, he became mayor of Zoetermeer.

Aptroot was elected into the House of Representatives in the general election of 2003. In 2010 he contested in the election for Speaker of the House of Representatives, but was defeated by incumbent Speaker Gerdi Verbeet.

In the past Aptroot was a member of the municipal council of Wassenaar from 1982 to 1998 and an alderman of the same municipality from 1990 to 1996. He was also a member of the States of South Holland from 1999 to 2003.

From 1978 to 2001, Aptroot was together with his brother director of the Jonco-groep, a wholesale in mercery in Rotterdam.

In March 2020, Aptroot retired as mayor of Zoetermeer.

References
  Parlement.com biography

External links
  Charlie Aptroot personal website
 

1950 births
Living people
Aldermen of Wassenaar
Dutch agnostics
Dutch businesspeople
Dutch civil servants
Dutch corporate directors
Dutch educators
Erasmus University Rotterdam alumni
Mayors in South Holland
People from Zoetermeer
Members of the House of Representatives (Netherlands)
Members of the Provincial Council of South Holland
Knights of the Order of Orange-Nassau
Municipal councillors of Wassenaar
Politicians from The Hague
People's Party for Freedom and Democracy politicians
21st-century Dutch politicians